Charoenkrung Pracharak Hospital is a hospital in Thailand located in Bang Kho Laem District, Bangkok. It is a public hospital operated by the Medical Service Department, Bangkok Metropolitan Administration (BMA). It is a main teaching hospital of the School of Medicine, Mae Fah Luang University and an affiliated teaching hospital for the Faculty of Medicine Siriraj Hospital, Mahidol University and Phramongkutklao College of Medicine.

History 
In 1967, the BMA had plans to increase healthcare access for the people of Bangkok in the growing capital. A hospital was constructed at the southern end of Charoen Krung Road on the site of the old Bangkok abattoir. The hospital initially opened for obstetrics and gynecology patients only, since the Bang Kho Laem-Yannawa area had the highest birth rates in Bangkok but rapidly expanded to other specialities. The hospital officially opened as Bang Kho Laem Hospital on 25 November 1971. On 9 April 1976, the hospital was renamed to Charoenkrung Pracharak Hospital by King Bhumibol Adulyadej. The hospital became the main teaching hospital for the School of Medicine, Mae Fah Luang University in 2012 along with BMA General Hospital, both hospitals forming the Medical Education Center of the Medical Services Department, Bangkok Metropolitan Administration (MEC MSD BMA).

See also 
 Health in Thailand
 Healthcare in Thailand
 Hospitals in Thailand

References 

This article incorporates material from the corresponding article in the Thai Wikipedia.

Hospitals in Thailand
Hospitals in Bangkok
Bang Kho Laem district